¿Dónde está Elisa? (lit: Where is Elisa?) is a Chilean thriller television soap opera, that first appeared on television on April 21 of 2009 in TVN. It is written by Pablo Illanes, with scripts from Pablo Illanes, Nona Fernández, Hugo Morales and Josefina Fernández and is directed by María Eugenia Rencoret. In 2010, the telenovela was remade by the Telemundo network in the US, aTV in Turkey entitled Kızım Nerede? and MD Entertainment in Indonesia which is titled Di Mana Melani. In the Philippines, ABS-CBN is doing a remake entitled Nasaan Ka, Elisa?.

The story involves the events of the disappearance of Elisa (Montserrat Prats), one of the daughters of the couple formed by Raimundo Domínguez (Francisco Melo) and Francisca Correa (Sigrid Alegría), who after 17 years of marriage become so desperate that their own marriage is in danger.

Inspiration of the story comes from the real life drama involving vanished British native Madeleine McCann in Portugal. However, unlike the McCann story, the soap opera features a teenager who disappears and not a small child. The disappearance in a local club makes the story very similar to that of Jorge Matute Johns, a Chilean youngster who disappeared and was never seen again after leaving a party at a local disco. The list of suspects is long and includes family members, fellow students, and friends of the teenager who frequented the same places that she did prior to her disappearance.

Production of the opera began on August 14, 2008.

The first infomercial or preview of the production was shown on Friday, March 13, 2009.

Plot
The lives of the Dominguez family will change forever based on the events surrounding the disappearance of Elisa (Montserrat Prats), one of the daughters of the marriage of Raimundo Domínguez (Francisco Melo) and Francisca Correa (Sigrid Alegría).

Once she disappears, we begin to learn the secrets of every member of the family as well as those of her friends. Paranoia sets in, the past is dragged up, matters that were supposed to be buried reappear and recriminations among family members start.

All these events lead to a long list of suspects, among them family members (uncles, cousins, and her parents), fellow students, former employees of the Domínguez family and several friends who used to frequent the same places she did prior to her disappearance.

Cast

Main 

Montserrat Prats - Elisa Domínguez
Francisco Melo - Raimundo Domínguez
Sigrid Alegría - Francisca Correa
Álvaro Rudolphy - Comisario Camilo Rivas
Paola Volpato - Consuelo Domínguez
Francisco Reyes - Bruno Alberti
Francisca Imboden - Olivia Domínguez
Álvaro Morales - Ignacio Cousiño
César Caillet - Javier Goyeneche
Bárbara Ruiz-Tagle - Juanita Ovalle
Andrés Velasco - Nicólas Errázuriz
Alejandra Fosalba - Pamela Portugal

Recurring 

Mauricio Pesutic - Perfecto Néstor Salazar
Patricia López - Fiscal Adriana Castañeda
Juan José Gurruchaga - Ex Detective Briceño
Cristhian Sève - Sebastián Cousiño
Paulette Sève - Florencia Alberti
Nicolás Pérez - Gaspar Alberti
Gloria Canales - Sonia

Special Cast 

Amparo Noguera - Camilo's Psychologist
Begoña Basauri - Loreto Sandoval
Adriana Vacarezza - Isabel Cabunilas
Francisco Ossa - Álex
Yamila Reyna - Marisol
Claudio Arredondo - Ítalo
Teresa Hales - News Host

Cultural references
 Among the first names that the telenovela was planning to use were "Buscando a Elisa" (Looking for Elisa), "Desaparecida" (Missing) and "Elisa".
 It is the first telenovela for Montserrat Prats, after her professional debut in the series Mi primera vez (My first time) and Aída, both from TVN.
 Katyna Huberman had to leave the cast due to her pregnancy.
 The role of Francisco Reyes was originally to be played by Julio Milostich, but after the scandal that he was involved with, casting came up with people like Luciano Cruz-Coke, Bastián Bodenhöfer and Reyes himself; the first one had a contract with Roos Film and the second one with Canal 13. Finally the role went to Reyes, who had expressed a really great attitude in participating in a late evening production from TVN.
 This will be the second time where Francisca Imboden and Álvaro Morales will be a couple in fiction, after they played a couple in Pampa Ilusión (Isidora and Melchor).
The role of Cesar Caillet is a homosexual, who had an affair with the husband of his best friend.

Remake
It remade by Indonesia as Di Mana Melani?, Philippines as Nasaan Ka, Elisa? and India as Laut Aao Trisha

International Releases 
  Top Channel (Albania) (January 4, 2010)
  Shant TV (Armenia)
  Farsi1 (Iran)
  Zone Romantica, Czech Republic (2010)
  Zone Romantica, Slovakia (2010)
  Zone Romantica, Serbia (2010)
  Zone Romantica, Croatia (2010)
  Zone Romantica, Slovenia (2010)
  Zone Romantica, Romania (2010)
  Zone Romantica, Bulgaria (2010, 2011)
  aTV, Turkey (2010)
  ABS-CBN, Philippines (2011)
  Studio 23, Philippines (2013)
  TVN, South Korea (2014)

Curiosities
 The first few episodes were transmitted between the end of the News (24 Horas) and the beginning of the weather reports (TV Tiempo).
 In the Facebook-like page that Elisa was using, her mother tells authorities that a message appeared, this denotes two errors; first, no anonymous messages can be received on this site, since only registered users can send and receive messages; secondly, the message was sent by Elisa's profile itself, which means that she sent the message or somebody that knew her password.
 The supposed message from the "Facebook" account was sent with an IP address that starts with 68.xxx.xxx.xxx, while in Chile one could only use the format 200.xxx.xxx.xxx.
 The search engine that Francisca Correa was using, called "Search", utilizes the same format as Google.
 In the telenovela's debut, two episodes were transmitted back to back without commercial interruption.
Paulette Sève and Christian Sève, who play cousins in the telenovela (Florencia and Sebastián) are really brother and sister in real life.
The newspaper called "El ciudadano", utilizes the same format as La Tercera.
Starting on Monday, July 20, the slogan of the telenovela will be changed from "A todos nos puede pasar" (It could happen to anyone) to "Mirando a través del mal" (Looking through evil eyes), this is because starting on episode 52 transmitted on the same day, the audience will know who the kidnapper is.

References

External links
Web site from TVN

2009 telenovelas
2009 Chilean television series debuts
2009 Chilean television series endings
Chilean telenovelas
Spanish-language telenovelas
Televisión Nacional de Chile telenovelas